The Columbia Hits Collection is a 2001 compilation album of songs recorded by the American singer Jo Stafford. It was released by Corinthian Records on January 1, 2001.

Track listing
 You Belong to Me
 Make Love to Me		 	 
 Keep It a Secret		 	 
 Shrimp Boats		 	 
 If		 	 
 Jambalaya (On the Bayou)		 	 
 Tennessee Waltz		 	 
 Around the Corner		 	 
 Hambone		 	 
 Hey, Good Lookin'		 	 
 In the Cool, Cool, Cool of the Evening		 	 
 Pretty Eyed Baby		 	 
 If You've Got the Money, I've Got the Time		 	 
 It's Almost Tomorrow		 	 
 Settin' the Woods on Fire		 	 
 Somebody		 	 
 Wind in the Willows		 	 
 Suddenly There's a Valley		 	 
 It's No Secret		 	 
 (Now and Then There's) A Fool Such as I		 	 
 Early Autumn	 	 
 On London Bridge		 	 
 Thank You for Calling		 	 
 With a Little Bit of Luck		 	 
 Gabriella (The Gamblin' Lady)		 	 
 Kissin' Bug Boogie		 	 
 Love Me Good		 	 
 All Night Long		 	 
 Teach Me Tonight

References

2001 compilation albums
Jo Stafford compilation albums
Corinthian Records compilation albums